Mogamat Zain Davids (born 4 May 1997) is a South African rugby union player, that competes in both the 15-man and sevens variants of the game. He is currently contracted by the South African Rugby Union to play for the South Africa Sevens national team. His regular position is in the loose-forward position, but he also played as a centre at schoolboy level.

Rugby career

2013–2015: Schoolboy rugby

Davids was born and grew up in Cape Town. He attended and played first team rugby for Rondebosch Boys' High School in the city, and earned provincial colours on several occasions representing  at youth tournaments. In 2014, he was named in the Western Province squad for South Africa's premier schools rugby union competition, the Under-18 Craven Week, held in Middelburg. He started all three of their matches and again scored one try, in a match against the Free State.

He represented Western Province at the same tournaments a year later, as the team hosted the event held in Stellenbosch. Davids helped the team to reach the main match in the tournament, where they beat their Eastern Province counterparts 95–0 to become the unofficial champions. After the tournament, Davids was included in a South Africa Schools 'A' squad for the Under-18 International Series held in August 2015. He scored a try in his side's 29–14 victory over Italy in their first match and also started in their 8–33 defeat to England four days later. Davids was promoted to the senior South Africa Schools team following injuries to Ruben van Heerden and Cobus Wiese, and he came on as a replacement in their final match of the series, a 23–16 victory over England.

2016: South Africa Under-20 and Western Province Under-19

After high school, Davids joined 's academy, the Western Province Rugby Institute. In March 2016, he was included in a South Africa Under-20 training squad, and made the cut for a reduced provisional squad a week later. On 10 May 2016, he was included in the final South Africa Under-20 squad for the 2016 World Rugby Under 20 Championship tournament to be held in Manchester in England. He started all three of their matches in Pool C of the competition; after scoring two tries in their opening match, a 59–19 victory over Japan, he was on the losing side in the second match, as Argentina won the match 19–13. He scored another try in their final match, a 40–31 victory over France, try that ensured South Africa qualified for the semi-finals as the best runner-up. Davids also started their semi-final against hosts England, but could not prevent them from suffering a 17–39 loss and he was on the losing side again in the third-place play-off as South Africa lost to Argentina for the second time in the tournament, ending in fourth position overall. Davids' three tries ensured he finished the tournament as South Africa's top try-scoring forward and joint-top try scorer alongside backs Manie Libbok and Edwill van der Merwe.

Upon Davids' return to South Africa, he was named in the  squad that competed in the 2016 Under-19 Provincial Championship. He played in six of their twelve matches during the regular season, scoring one try in their match against the  team en route to finishing top of the log, with ten wins and just two defeats. At the end of the season, Davids won the BrightRock U21 Bounce Player of the Year award at Western Province's end-of-year awards ceremony.

2016–present: Sevens

In November 2016, Davids was included in a South Africa Sevens Academy squad; after being included in the squad for a local tournament, he earned a place in the squad that played at an International Invitational tournament that was held as part of the 2016 Dubai Sevens, helping the team reach the final of the tournament.

In January 2017, Davids was included in the senior South Africa Sevens squad for the 2017 Wellington Sevens tournament as a replacement for the injured former captain Kyle Brown.

In 2022, He was part of the South African team that won their second Commonwealth Games gold medal in Birmingham.

References

External links
 
 Mogamat Zaïn Davids at It's Rugby

South African rugby union players
Living people
1997 births
Sportspeople from Cape Town
Rugby union flankers
Rugby union number eights
South Africa international rugby sevens players
South Africa Under-20 international rugby union players
Alumni of Rondebosch Boys' High School
Rugby sevens players at the 2020 Summer Olympics
Rugby sevens players at the 2018 Commonwealth Games
Olympic rugby sevens players of South Africa
Sharks (rugby union) players
Sharks (Currie Cup) players
Rugby sevens players at the 2022 Commonwealth Games
Commonwealth Games gold medallists for South Africa
Commonwealth Games medallists in rugby sevens
Medallists at the 2022 Commonwealth Games